Judge William Fleming (July 6, 1736 – February 15, 1824) was an American lawyer, jurist and political figure from Cumberland County, Virginia. He is often confused with his contemporary, Colonel William Fleming, who briefly served as Governor of Virginia during the American Revolution.

Biography
Judge Fleming was educated at The College of William & Mary, after which he started practicing law before the county courts. In 1772, he became a member of the House of Burgesses, representing Cumberland County as his father John Fleming had done before him, and remained in this position until that body was terminated by the revolution.  When the new state government of Virginia was instituted, he went back to Williamsburg as a member of the first House of Delegates.

On December 10, 1778, he was elected a member of Continental Congress, but it was April 1779 before he reported there. In September, he took a leave of absence and returned to Virginia and the House of Delegates. In 1781, he was elected and began serving as a judge of the Virginia general court.  Governor Beverley Randolph subsequently appointed Fleming to the Supreme Court of Appeals. When the court was reorganized in 1788, he was one of the five judges chosen for the new court. He became president and chief justice of the Court in 1809, a position he held until his death on February 15, 1824.

Summerville
In 1777, William Fleming moved from his plantation, Mt. Pleasant, in Cumberland County (changed to Powhatan County in that year), to neighboring Chesterfield County where he had bought another plantation called Summerville from Robert Moseley. This was to be his home for the remainder of his life. During his ownership, Summerville's land acreage increased from 528 acres to 906 acres. In 1781, while Richmond was being raided by Benedict Arnold, then Governor Thomas Jefferson stayed at Summerville for a night with his college friend William Fleming. Both Jefferson and Fleming had attended the College of William & Mary. Summerville was a working plantation in Virginia and as such, it had a number of slaves attending to it. In the 1820 United States census, William Fleming is reported as having 13 slaves, 9 males and 4 females. Many of these slaves died at Summerville and were buried in the burial grounds. On February 15, 1824, Judge Fleming died at his house at Summerville and was buried there as well. Summerville continued to be a prosperous plantation up until the end of the Civil War, at which point all of the slaves were emancipated. This caused the plantation to go to ruin and it appears that the Summerville house was abandoned. In the late 1980s most of the Summerville tract was built over by a housing development, including the area where the house would have stood and most likely the burial grounds of the slaves and William Fleming.

References

External links

1736 births
1824 deaths
Continental Congressmen from Virginia
18th-century American politicians
House of Burgesses members
Members of the Virginia House of Delegates
Chief Justices of the Supreme Court of Virginia
Virginia lawyers
People from Cumberland County, Virginia
College of William & Mary alumni